The Boston Braves were a professional ice hockey team in Boston, Massachusetts. They were a member of the American Hockey League (AHL) from 1971 to 1974.

History
The early 1970s saw an unprecedented boom in the popularity of hockey in the greater Boston area, fueled by the success of the Bobby Orr and Phil Esposito-led Boston Bruins. The Bruins had sold out all of their home games at the Boston Garden for years, and the team owners thought that placing their minor-league affiliate in the same arena made sense on several levels. Previously, the Bruins' top affiliates were the Hershey Bears of the AHL and the Oklahoma City Blazers of the Central Hockey League.

The team was named after the eponymous National League baseball team that had played in Boston until 1953 — which had been owned by Charles F. Adams, founder of the Bruins, during the 1930s. The first season of the AHL Braves, under coach Bep Guidolin, was wildly successful. Behind a powerful club led by future NHL stars Dan Bouchard and Rich Leduc, and with other veteran minor-leaguers and future NHL players such as Doug Roberts, Terry O'Reilly, Ross Brooks, Nick Beverley, Garry Peters and Don Tannahill, the club tied for first place in its division with the powerful Nova Scotia Voyageurs with a 41-21-14 mark, while proving popular enough in Boston to set league records for single-game and single-season attendance that survived for decades.

In its second season, however, competition from the New England Whalers of the World Hockey Association (WHA) served to saturate the market. Furthermore, NHL expansion cost the team its best player, Bouchard, who had been picked by the Atlanta Flames, while WHA defections caused the recall of Brooks to the parent club and the departure of Roberts and Peters to the rival league. While scoring declined only slightly, the defense was notably poorer. The team still finished second in the division with a 34-29-13 mark, but attendance had nearly halved.

In the Braves' third and final season, the defense collapsed to the point where the team finished out of the playoffs after a 23-40-13 record. With attendance dwindling further and the ebbing of the hockey boom itself in New England, Bruins' management decided to suspend the team; the next season saw the Bruins affiliating with the Rochester Americans (whose coach and general manager, Don Cherry, had just become the Bruins' head coach.)

The Bruins maintained the franchise's existence for many years, paying a nominal fee to the league to keep it dormant, finally selling its rights to the Winnipeg Jets in 1987 so that the Jets could move it to the Maritimes to become the Moncton Hawks.

Team records
Single season
 Goals: Ron Anderson, 41, 1973
 Assists:  Doug Gibson, 51, 1974
 Points:  Gibson, 82, 1974
 Penalty minutes:  Fred O'Donnell, 161, 1972
Career
 Career games:  Neil Murphy, 214
 Career goals:  Bob Gryp, 68
 Career assists:  Rich Leduc, 80
 Career points:  Leduc, 144
 Career penalty minutes:  Leduc, 227

Season-by-season results
Regular season

Playoffs

External links
 Boston Braves at hockeydb.com

Defunct ice hockey teams in the United States
Ice hockey clubs established in 1971
Ice hockey teams in Boston
Ice hockey clubs disestablished in 1974
1971 establishments in Massachusetts
1974 disestablishments in Massachusetts
Boston Bruins minor league affiliates